Günther Herrmann may refer to:

 Günther Herrmann (footballer) (born 1939), German football player
 Günther Herrmann (SS commander) (1908−2004), Nazi German functionary and convicted criminal

See also
 Günter Hermann (born 1960), German football manager
 Günter Herrmann (1934–2012), German footballer who represented Saarland
 Gunther Hermann, character from the Deus Ex video game